Phycopsis is a genus of sponges belonging to the family Axinellidae. The species of this genus are found in Malesia and Australia.

Species 
This genus contains the following eight species:
 Phycopsis epakros (Hooper & Lévi, 1993)
 Phycopsis fruticulosa Carter, 1883
 Phycopsis fusiformis (Lévi, 1967)
 Phycopsis hirsuta Carter, 1883
 Phycopsis papillata (Hooper & Lévi, 1993)
 Phycopsis pesgalli Alvarez, de Voogd & van Soest, 2016
 Phycopsis setosa (Bowerbank, 1873)
 Phycopsis styloxeata Lage, Carvalho & Menegola, 2013

References

Axinellidae
Sponge genera
Taxa named by Henry John Carter